The Ossau Valley (French: Vallée d'Ossau; Gascon: Aussau / la vath d'Aussau) is a valley of the French Pyrénées, in the Pyrénées-Atlantiques département.

Administration 
18 communes belong to the Valley: Arudy, Aste-Béon, Béost, Bescat, Bielle, Bilhères, Buzy, Castet, Eaux-Bonnes, Gère-Bélesten, Izeste, Laruns, Louvie-Juzon, Louvie-Soubiron, Lys, Rébénacq, Sainte-Colome and Sévignacq-Meyracq.

See also
 Gave d'Ossau (river)
 Pic du Midi d'Ossau
 Col d'Aubisque
 Gourette
 Ossau-Iraty (cheese)
 Petit train d'Artouste

References

External links

Landforms of Pyrénées-Atlantiques
Valleys of France
Nouvelle-Aquitaine region articles needing translation from French Wikipedia